Ambrose Lwiji Lufuma (born October 26, 1957) is a Zambian politician, businessman, and economist. He is Zambia's current Minister of Defense.

Early life
Ambrose was born to Raphael Lufuma and Chisengo in 1957, in Kawanda Village of Kabompo.
He attended Kawanda Primary School. In 1972, he was transferred to Mpima Seminary for his high school education.

Career
In 1976, he joined the Zambia National Service and underwent military training after graduating from high school. He, later was selected to go the University of Zambia; there he studied Economics.

Political career
In the 90s, Ambrose became friends with UPND founder, Anderson Mazoka and soon joined his political party. He contested in the 2011 and 2016 Zambian general election as Kabompo  Member of Parliament and he emerged victorious in both.
Ambrose contested in the 2021 Zambian general election, as an MP for Kabompo, again, he emerged victorious. A few weeks later, he was appointed as the Minister of Defense by President Hichilema.

Parliamentary history

Personal life
Ambrose married Sombo Chinyama, together, they have 5 children.

References

Living people
1957 births
Members of the National Assembly of Zambia
21st-century Zambian politicians
United Party for National Development politicians
University of Zambia alumni
Defence Ministers of Zambia
People from Kabompo District